The 2019–20 season was Girona Futbol Club's 90th season in existence and the club's first season back in the second division of Spanish football. In addition to the domestic league, Girona FC participated in this season's edition of the Copa del Rey. The season was slated to cover a period from 1 July 2019 to 30 June 2020. It was extended extraordinarily beyond 30 June due to the COVID-19 pandemic in Spain.

Players

Current squad

Out on loan

Pre-season and friendlies

Competitions

Overview

Segunda División

League table

Results summary

Results by round

Matches
The fixtures were revealed on 4 July 2019.

Play-offs

Copa del Rey

Statistics

Goalscorers

References

External links

Girona FC seasons
Girona FC
2019–20 in Catalan football